, containing the Ata North Caldera, Mount Kaimon and Ikeda Caldera  amongst other volcanos, is a massive, ill defined, mostly submerged volcanic caldera associated with the southern portions of Kagoshima Bay.

Geology
The earliest tephra assigned to the volcano, is the widespread on regional sea bed cores, Ata–Torihama tephra (Ata-Th) at 240,000 years before the present. 

The caldera contributed to an eruption which has been dated to about 100,000 years before present (range by various techniques mostly fall 100,000 to 109,000) that generated the Ata tephra in southern Japan. This is overlaid in some places in Japan by the more recent Mitake No. 1 (On-Pm1) tephra from an eruption in the Mount Ontake area and K-Tz tephra from the Kikai Caldera. There have been many more lesser eruptions.

Structure
Some of the recent literature separates the caldera into a northern almost completely submerged caldera that generated the Ata tephra and Ata ignimbrite, and a southern  caldera which includes the recently active Ikeda Caldera and the Kaimondake stratovolcano in the Ibusuki Volcanic Field.   This southern caldera first had the Ata name but is not believed now to be associated with the vents of the major eruption of 100,000 years ago. High resolution Bouguer gravity imaging of Kyushu is consistent with the larger caldera being the Ata North Caldera but suggests it may be centred near the island of Chiringashima, and that the Ata South Caldera is the smaller in size, overlaps it being centred near Yamagawafukumoto district.

The National Catalogue of the Active Volcanoes of Japan (JMA, 2013) included features of the Ibusuki Volcanic Field as part of the Ata post-caldera system. By this definition the single caldera may be a rounded triangle about 30km in length and up to 25km in width, although the usual quoted size is smaller.

Relationships
Immediately adjacent to the north of the caldera is the Sakurajima volcano in the Aira Caldera and further away to the south along what has been termed the Kagoshima Graben is the Kikai Caldera. This alignment was first described by Tadaiti Matumoto in the 1940s.  The alignment extends all the way north past Mount Kirishima to intersect the Aso Caldera by gravitational anomaly.   The tectonic processes are rather complex in this region where the Okinawa Plate is colliding with the Amur Plate and the Pacific Plate is subducting under both.

References

Volcanoes of Kyushu
VEI-7 volcanoes
Calderas of Kyushu
Submarine calderas
Pleistocene calderas
Active volcanoes
Supervolcanoes
Volcanoes of Kagoshima Prefecture
Paleolithic Japan